This is a list of songs released with the approval of the Football Association to coincide with the England national football team's participation in the finals of the FIFA World Cup or the UEFA European Championship.

The tradition of World Cup songs began in 1970. Some of the later official songs were eclipsed by unofficial songs released around the same time; at least 15 World Cup-themed singles were released for the 2002 finals, and 30 for 2006.

The FA announced in January 2010 there would be no official England song for the 2010 World Cup. Likewise, no official song was commissioned for the 2018 tournament.

See also
England national football team discography

References

External links
 Chart Archive : World Cups everyhit.com, 2002. UK Top 20 for each World Cup since 1954, together with a list of World-Cup related songs.
 This Time, We’ll Get It Right, 29 March 2006, Yogi's Warrior, "A Cultured Left Foot"

 
Lists of patriotic songs
Songs